Stan Mataele is a former nose tackle in the National Football League.

Biography
Mataele was born on June 24, 1963 in Honolulu, Hawaii.

Career 
Mataele was drafted by the Tampa Bay Buccaneers in the eighth round of the 1987 NFL Draft and later played with the Green Bay Packers that season. He played at the collegiate level at the University of Arizona.

See also
List of Green Bay Packers players

References

Players of American football from Honolulu
Green Bay Packers players
American football defensive tackles
University of Arizona alumni
Arizona Wildcats football players
1963 births
Living people
Sacramento City Panthers football players